National Gypsum Company is a company based in Charlotte, North Carolina, that produces drywall gypsum boards in the US. It has 17 gypsum board plants in the US and presents itself as a fully integrated building products manufacturer. It is a private company, incorporated as New NGC, Inc. in 1993. It is one of the six producers which hold approximately 81% of
the worldwide wallboard market (Georgia Pacific, Knauf,
Continental Building Products, National Gypsum, Saint-Gobain, and Yoshino Gypsum Co., Ltd)

Subsidiary National Gypsum (Canada) Ltd. operates the largest open-pit gypsum mine in the world in Milford Station Nova Scotia.

The company was founded in 1925 by Melvin H. Baker, Joseph F. Haggerty, and Clarence E. Williams.

External links

References

Privately held companies based in North Carolina
Companies based in Charlotte, North Carolina